Kevin Michael Kern (born May 18, 1974, in Ohio)
is a Broadway actor.  He originated the role of J. M. Barrie on the 2016 National Tour of Finding Neverland.  He has appeared in six Broadway shows and one show in London's West End.  He is married to Megan Lawrence and they have four children named Gus, Sunny Jo, Magnolia, and Clover.

Credits
His Broadway credits include Fiyero in Wicked as well as roles in The Wedding Singer, Finding Neverland, First Date, The Bridges of Madison County and Les Misérables. (In Les Mis, he played numerous roles, including Marius, Jean Prouvaire, Joly and Marius (understudy) with the "approximate dates: 1997 to 1999; 2001 to 2003 (not necessarily continuously)."

http://www.playbill.com/person/kevin-kern-vault-0000047611

Education
He is a cum laude graduate of New York University.  He has a B.M. in Vocal Performance and a "full scholarship and one year study - M.A. in Music Vocal Performance."  Prior to NYU, he was a 1992 graduate of St. Xavier High School (Cincinnati).

Personal life
He married Megan Lawrence in June 1999.  They have four children.

References

http://www.broadway.com/buzz/185793/believe-kevin-kern-christine-dwyer-tom-hewitt-will-lead-the-national-tour-of-finding-neverland/

Steinhardt School of Culture, Education, and Human Development alumni
Male actors from Cincinnati
American male musical theatre actors
St. Xavier High School (Ohio) alumni
1974 births
Living people